Friedrich Kunath (born 1974) is a German visual artist who lives in Los Angeles. He was born in Chemnitz, East Germany, and has had solo exhibitions at the Kunsthal Kade Amersfoort (2016), Schinkel Pavillon (2011), the Hammer Museum, Los Angeles (2010), Kunstverein Hannover (2009), Kunsthalle Baden-Baden (2009), Aspen Art Museum (2008). Group exhibitions include 'The World Belongs to You', Palazzo Grassi, Venice (2011), '11th Triennale für Kleinplastik, Fellbach' (2010) and  'Life on Mars: the 55th Carnegie International' (2008).

Early life
Kunath was born in 1974 in Karl-Marx-stadt, later renamed Chemnitz, in East Germany. His mother was a band manager. The family moved to West Germany, and Kunath began attending the Braunschweig University of Art.

Exhibitions
1994
The easiest thing to grow in a garden is tired, Galerie Peters-Barenbrock, Braunschweig, Germany
2003
 Statement, BQ Gallery, Art Basel, Switzerland
2007
Twilight, Andrea Rosen Gallery, New York
2008
Life on Mars, Carnegie International
2012
Lacan's Haircut, Blum & Poe, Los Angeles, California
2013
Raymond Moody’s Blues, Modern Art Oxford
I'm Running Out of World, White Cube, London
2014
A Plan To Follow Summer Around The World, Le Crédac, Ivry-sur-Seine, France

Art market
Kunath was represented by Johann König until 2022.

References

External links

Friedrich Kunath at Blum and Poe
More information and images from Andrea Rosen Gallery
Friedrich Kunath on ArtFacts.net
Friedrich Kunath on ArtNet.com
Further information from the Saatchi Gallery

German artists
Living people
1974 births
German contemporary artists